Benchmarking requires the use of specific valuation methods. With evaluation is meant the level of achieving the target for a particular evaluation item. There are general "methods" respectively approaches as well as IT-supported "software tools" that enable an effective and efficient work.

The following is a list of notable methods and benchmarking software tools.

Benchmarking methods 

There are many benchmarking methods each having different analytical focus. The methods are mostly known and will be shown in the following summary.

Benchmarking software tools 

There are a number software tools that allow the support of different kinds of benchmarking types.

Benchmarking HPC Clusters 
There are numerous suites for examining the performance of a High Performance Computing cluster, including
 ADEPT  4 suites relating to energy measurements
 HPCC, HPCG, Linpack
 IMB (Intel MPI Benchmark)  gives rates for common MPI-1 point-to-point and collectives
 Mantevo  series of "mini apps" from Sandia National Labs (SNL)
 NAS and NPB
 SHOC  for accelerators
 Stream (memory b/w)

See also 
 Benchmarking
 Best practice

References 

Strategic management